German submarine U-954 was a Type VIIC submarine of Nazi Germany's Kriegsmarine in World War II.

Design
German Type VIIC submarines were preceded by the shorter Type VIIB submarines. U-954 had a displacement of  when at the surface and  while submerged. She had two shafts and two  propellers.

U-954 was fitted with five  torpedo tubes (four fitted at the bow and one at the stern), fourteen torpedoes, one  SK C/35 naval gun, 220 rounds, and one twin  C/30 anti-aircraft gun. The boat had a complement of between forty-four and sixty.

Service history

Wolfpacks
U-954 took part in five wolfpacks, namely:
 Meise (25 – 27 April 1943) 
 Star (27 April – 4 May 1943) 
 Fink (4 – 6 May 1943) 
 Inn (11 – 15 May 1943) 
 Donau 2 (15 – 19 May 1943)

Fate
One of those killed in the sinking was Admiral Karl Dönitz's son Peter Dönitz.

See also
Convoy SC 130

References

Bibliography

External links

U-boats sunk in 1941
World War II submarines of Germany
World War II shipwrecks in the Atlantic Ocean
1942 ships
U-boats commissioned in 1942
U-boats sunk in 1943
U-boats sunk by depth charges
U-boats sunk by British warships
Ships built in Hamburg
German Type VIIC submarines
Ships lost with all hands